Bruce L. Gordon is a Canadian philosopher of science (physics), metaphysician and philosopher of religion.  He is a proponent of intelligent design and has been affiliated with the Discovery Institute since 1997.

Biography

Early life and education
Gordon was born in Calgary, Alberta, Canada in 1963.

Gordon earned two undergraduate degrees, one in piano performance at the Royal Conservatory of Music at the University of Toronto in 1982 and another in applied mathematics at the University of Calgary in 1986. He was awarded a master's degree in analytic philosophy from the University of Calgary in 1988. He moved to the United States for graduate study in 1988, and has been a permanent resident ever since. In 1990, Gordon received a master's degree in apologetics and systematic theology from Westminster Theological Seminary in Philadelphia. Finally, he was awarded a Ph.D. from Northwestern University in Evanston, Illinois in the history and philosophy of science (physics) in 1998.

Career
In 1997 he became an affiliate of the Discovery Institute.

He was a visiting assistant professor of philosophy at the University of Notre Dame and a Fellow in the Center for Philosophy of Religion at Notre Dame in 1998–99.

In 1999 he was appointed as a non-tenured associate research professor at Baylor University, and was appointed as associate director of the short-lived Michael Polanyi Center there, which was directed by William Dembski. The center was a step forward in the Discovery Institute's wedge strategy in that it established a beachhead for intelligent design within a major US university. The Baylor faculty rejected the Center in 2000, Dembski was removed as director, and Gordon was appointed interim director.  By 2001 the center had been renamed The Baylor Science and Religion Project and placed under the institute. By 2002 it had been again renamed to the Baylor Center for Science, Philosophy and Religion, still with Gordon at its head.

Gordon left Baylor in 2005 to join the Discovery Institute and by 2008 was the director of its Center for Science and Culture.

Gordon is a known proponent of intelligent design and Fellow of the International Society for Complexity, Information and Design (ISCID). He was the managing editor of the moribund Access Research Network journal Origin and Design, as of its last issue (20:1) and an associate editor of the likewise moribund ISCID journal.

In April 2010 Gordon was named Associate Professor of Science and Mathematics at The King's College, New York.

In 2012, he started working at Houston Baptist University.

References

External links

Writings
 Maxwell-Boltzmann Statistics and the Metaphysics of Modality, Bruce L. Gordon
Fock Space metaphysics, Bruce L. Gordon
The Nature of Nature: Examining the Role of Naturalism in Science, Bruce L. Gordon and William A. Dembski, editors. Contains three essays by Gordon: "The Rise of Naturalism and Its Problematic Role in Science and Culture," "A Quantum-Theoretic Argument against Naturalism," and "Balloons on a String: A Critique of Multiverse Cosmology."
Inflationary Cosmology and the String Multiverse, New Proofs for the Existence of God: Contributions of Contemporary Physics and Philosophy, by Robert J. Spitzer, contains a substantial appendix by Bruce Gordon on inflationary cosmology and the string landscape hypothesis.

1963 births
Discovery Institute fellows and advisors
Fellows of the International Society for Complexity, Information, and Design
Intelligent design advocates
Living people
People from Calgary
The Royal Conservatory of Music alumni
University of Toronto alumni
University of Notre Dame faculty
Westminster Theological Seminary alumni